Char Silinda is a village in Barisal District in the Barisal Division of southern-central Bangladesh.

References

Villages in Barisal District
Villages in Barisal Division